Susanto Megaranto (born 8 October 1987) is an Indonesian chess player. In 2004, he became the youngest Indonesian ever to qualify for the title Grandmaster at 17, beating out Utut Adianto's record by four years. He won the Indonesian Chess Championship four times in a row from 2006 to 2010. He graduated from Gunadarma University.

In 2004 he tied for 2nd-3rd with Eugenio Torre in the SEA Games in Vietnam. In the same year he tied for first with Mark Paragua in the Singapore Masters Open and won the event on tie-break. In 2007 he tied for 3rd-8th with Abhijit Kunte, Zhao Jun, Wen Yang, Darwin Laylo and Zhou Jianchao in the Asian Chess Championship. In 2008, he tied for 3rd-7th with Marat Dzhumaev, Darwin Laylo, Dražen Sermek and Ashot Nadanian in the 5th Dato' Arthur Tan Malaysia Open Championship in Kuala Lumpur and tied for 3rd-6th with Nguyen Anh Dung, Irwanto Sadikin and Magesh Chandran Panchanathan in the Kuala Lumpur Open. 
He took part in the Chess World Cup 2011, where he was eliminated in the first round by Lê Quang Liêm.
In 2015, he won the first Asian University Chess Championship, which was held in Beijing.

References

External links
 
 
 
 
 Dua Mahasiswa Gunadarma Kuasai Turnamen Catur Mongolia Open 

1987 births
Living people
Indonesian chess players
Chess grandmasters
Chess Olympiad competitors
Asian Games competitors for Indonesia
Chess players at the 2006 Asian Games
Chess players at the 2010 Asian Games
Southeast Asian Games medalists in chess
Southeast Asian Games gold medalists for Indonesia
Southeast Asian Games silver medalists for Indonesia
Southeast Asian Games bronze medalists for Indonesia
Competitors at the 2005 Southeast Asian Games
Competitors at the 2011 Southeast Asian Games
People from Jakarta
Competitors at the 2021 Southeast Asian Games
20th-century Indonesian people
21st-century Indonesian people